Counterfeiters is a 1940 German crime film directed by Hermann Pfeiffer and starring Kirsten Heiberg, Rudolf Fernau and Karin Himboldt.

The film's sets were designed by the art director Max Mellin. It was shot at the Babelsberg and Tempelhof Studios in Berlin, and on location in Tirol.

Cast
 Kirsten Heiberg as Juliette Balouet, Betrügerin
 Rudolf Fernau as Gaston de Frossard, Kopf der Fälscherbande
 Karin Himboldt as Hanna, Kunstschülerin
 Hermann Brix as Herbert Engelke, Grafiker
 Theodor Loos as Professor Bassi
 Hermann Speelmans as Karl Bergmann aka Harry Gernreich
 Leo Peukert as Johann Weidling
 Lutz Götz as Poppinger, Viehhändler
 Axel Monjé as Obersturmführer Dr. Bradt, Kriminalkommissar
 Max Gülstorff as Zeltlin, Kriminalinspektor aus Zürich
 Ingeborg von Kusserow as Else Bornemann
 Peter Elsholtz as Fälscher
 Jakob Tiedtke as Papa Schmidt, Toilettenmann
 Hans Stiebner as Nico, Fälscher
 Oscar Sabo as Oskar, Komplize der Bande in Berlin
 Bruno Hübner as Hubert Bonifatius, ein bekannter der Schwestern Lieb
 Olga Engl as Antonie Lieb, Inhaberin des Schuhgeschäfts
 Julia Serda as Elvira
 Christa Dilthey as Juliette, Zofe auf Schloß Hohenegg
 Franz Arzdorf as Kellner im Berliner Restaurant
 Walter Bechmann as Hoteldiener in Zürich
 Friedrich Beug as Handlanger in der Fälscherbande
 Heinz Berghaus as Willy, der Kneipenwirt
 Eduard Bornträger as Hotelportier
 Erich Dunskus as Taxichauffeur
 Fritz Eckert as Kriminalbeamter im Polizeilabor
 Wilhelm Egger-Sell as Hotelportier
 Fred Goebel as Kellner im Berliner Restaurant
 Knut Hartwig as Kriminalbeamter, der Poppinger verhört
 Oskar Höcker as Polizist am Revier
 Fred Köster as Paketbote im Züricher Hotel
 Hermann Meyer-Falkow as Polizeibeamter in Uniform
 Paul Mederow as Tomaselli, Kunstsammler
 Michael von Newlinsky as Kellner im Berliner Restaurant
 Georg A. Profé as Kellner im Berliner Restaurant
 Klaus Pohl as Straßenzeitungsverkäufer
 Walter Pose as Polizist am Revier
 Alfred Pussert as Weber, Techniker im Polizeilabor
 Max Vierlinger as Kassierer im Hotel
 Ewald Wenck as Taxichauffeur
 Willy Witte as Obersturmführer Kluger der Berliner Kriminalpolizei
 Max Harry Ernst as Gast bei Tomaselli
 Angelo Ferrari as Ein Mitglied der Fälscherbande
 Benno Gellenbeck as Professor der Zeichenklasse
 Karl Jüstel as Gast bei Tomaselli
 Alfred Karen as Gast bei Tomaselli
 Isolde Laugs as Frau im Zeitungskiosk
 Bruno Tillessen as Ober im Hotelspeisesaal

References

Bibliography 
 Rolf Giesen. Nazi Propaganda Films: A History and Filmography. McFarland, 2003.

External links 
 

1940 films
1940 crime films
German crime films
Films of Nazi Germany
1940s German-language films
Films directed by Hermann Pfeiffer
Terra Film films
Films shot at Babelsberg Studios
Films shot at Tempelhof Studios
Counterfeit money in film
1940s German films